The men's singles Squash event was part of the squash programme and took place between September 30 and October 4, at the Yangsan College Gymnasium.

Schedule
All times are Korea Standard Time (UTC+09:00)

Results
Legend
WO — Won by walkover

Finals

Top half

Section 1

Section 2

Bottom half

Section 3

Section 4

References 

2002 Asian Games Official Report, Page 704
Results

Squash at the 2002 Asian Games